Rani Ratnaprabha is a 1960 Telugu-language swashbuckling fantasy film, produced and directed by B. A. Subba Rao under the B. A. S. Productions banner. It stars N. T. Rama Rao and Anjali Devi, with music composed by S. Rajeswara Rao.

Plot
The film begins Amarasimha (N. T. Rama Rao) king of Ratnapuri, moves for hunting where he meets a guy Bhaja Bhadraiah (Relangi), he keeps him in his place and he changes his attire as a soldier just for fun. In the forest, Amarasimha gets acquaintance with a beautiful girl Ratnaprabha (Anjali Devi) and both of them fall in love at first sight. Dharmapala (Gummadi) foster father Ratnaprabha watches this, thinking Amarasimha as the soldier, Dharmapala becomes angry and scolds them. After returning to the capital, Amarasimha orders his Chief Minister Sarpaketu (C.S.R) to make his marriage arrangements with Ratnaprabha. During the time of marriage, Ratnaprabha is surprised to see Amarasimha tying the knot and her happiness is boundless. Actually, Sarpakaketu is a womanizer and want to possess Ratnaprabha at any cost. So, he plots send his girlfriend Manjula (Sandhya) as a maid to trap Ratnaprabha. Meanwhile, an old monk visits Dharmapala who is Ratnabhupala, the original ruler of Ratnapuri and father of Ratnaprabha. He is defeated by Veerasimha father of Amarasimha, escaped into the forest along with his daughter, handed over Ratnaprabha to Dharmapala and went for penance. Once Ratnaprabha meets him in the garden through a secret path which is not even known by Amarasimha. Manjula follows her and tells badly about Ratnaprabha's character to Amarasimha. He too notices Ratnaprabha coming from the secret path when he suspects her and Ratnaprabha is not able to reveal the truth because it may be dangerous to her father's life. Angered Amarasimha arrests Dharmapala, gives a blank royal assent to Sarpakaketu and asks him to punish Ratnaprabha appropriately. Sarpaketu takes advantage of the situation, by keeping some conditions on it, asks Manjula to handover it to Ratnaprabha with a poison bottle. Ratnaprabha starts reading the conditions, to prove her chastity Ratnaprabha must die taking the poison, get back her life and marry Amarasimha 3 times without revealing her identity.

Ratnaprabha dies taking the poison, her body is buried, immediately Sarpakethu digs her out, gives the antidote to the poison and makes her alive. Knowing regarding the death of Ratnaprabha Dharmapala, Ratnabhupala and people of the kingdom become furious. After coming into conscious Ratnaprabha understands the bad intention of Sarpakethu. Now Sarpakethu tries to molest her when Manjula obstructs his way and he stamps her out. At the same time, a dacoits gang attack on Sarpakethu's house, fortunately, its leader Ranadheer was the chief commander of Ratnabhupala who has settled in the forest after losing the kingdom. He saves Ratnaprabha, takes along with him and treats as his own daughter. Distressed Amarasimha again visits the forest where Sarpakethu's men attack when he is wounded and protected by Ranadheer & his men. Amarasimha has given hospitality in there hamlet when Ratnaprabha acts as Ranadheer's dumb daughter and marries Amarasimha without his knowledge. Here Amarasimha is not ready to accept the match, so, he is arrested. Parallelly, Sarpakethu learns that Amarasimha has sensed his reality, so, he shacks hand with Dharmapala, occupies the kingdom and makes Ratnabhupala as the ruler. In the forest, Ratnaprabha again changes her attire as a black girl and servers Amarasimha. He asks her to help him in escaping when she keeps a condition to marry her and he does so. After reaching the capital he gets captured and Ratnaprabha reveals the entire truth to her father and Dharmapala. Amarasimha is presented in the court, the king gives death sentence to him and keeps a condition that he can be relieved if he ready to marry his daughter. As there is no other choice he marries Ratnaprabha in the mask. After the marriage, Ratnaprabha brings out all the facts, proves her chastity. At last, Amarasimha realizes his mistake, explains it is all treason of Sarpakethu and he is put to life imprisonment. Finally, the movie ends on a happy note with the reunion of Amarasimha & Ratnaprabha.

Cast
N. T. Rama Rao as Amara Simhudu
Anjali Devi as Rani Ratnaprabha
Relangi as Bhaja Bhadraiah
Gummadi as Dharmapala
C.S.R as Mahamantri Sarpakaketu
Balakrishna
Surabhi Balasaraswathi as Nukkalamma
Sandhya as Manjula

Soundtrack

Music composed by S. Rajeswara Rao. Music released by H. M. V. Audio Company.

References

1960s Telugu-language films
1960s fantasy adventure films
Indian fantasy adventure films
Films scored by S. Rajeswara Rao
Indian swashbuckler films